Sankt Katharinen is a municipality in the district of Neuwied, in Rhineland-Palatinate, Germany.

Geography
The districts landscape covers the Westerwald mountains, east of the Rhine river valley. The Rhine forms the western boundary of the district.

Localities

Ginsterhahn
Notscheid
Sengenau
Steinshardt
Strödt

References

Neuwied (district)